<mapframe
text="Fena Lake"
width=230 	
height=300	
zoom=14
latitude=13.353842
longitude=144.700058/>

Fena Lake (Reservoir) is the largest lake in the United States territory of Guam and it is a man made reservoir. It is located in the south of the island on the Ordnance Annex military installation, and is overlooked by the nearby peaks of Mounts Lamlam, Alifan and Jumullong Manglo. The lake's outflow is to the north-west, its waters eventually reaching the Pacific Ocean at Talofofo Bay.

History
Construction began in the late 1940s and the Fena Reservoir was completed in 1951. The purpose of the reservoir was to provide water for the citizens. The total cost of the project was $11 million U.S. dollars. An 85 foot tall dam was constructed by the US Navy. 

The source of all drinking water on Guam is rain. Rain water also supplies all of the water for this reservoir.

See also
List of rivers of Guam
List of lakes in Guam

Further reading
Bendure, G. & Friary, N. (1988) Micronesia:A travel survival kit. South Yarra, VIC: Lonely Planet.

References

External links

Geography of Guam
Lakes of Guam